Astragalus pulsiferae is a species of milkvetch known by the common name Ames's milkvetch. It is native to California and Nevada, and it is known but rare in Washington. It is known from many habitat types, including mountains and plateaus.

Description
This is a very small perennial herb forming small mats or patches on the ground. The inflorescence is an array of 3 to 13 small flowers, each white with purplish veins and tips.

External links
Jepson Manual Treatment
USDA Plants Profile
Photo gallery

pulsiferae
Flora of California
Flora of Nevada
Flora of the Sierra Nevada (United States)
Flora without expected TNC conservation status